Springside Chestnut Hill Academy (also known as SCH Academy or SCH) is an independent, non-sectarian Pre-K through grade 12 school located in Chestnut Hill, Philadelphia, Pennsylvania, approximately 10 miles from Center City.

SCH serves over 1,100 students from more than 100 zip codes, as well as from other countries. 40% of its students identify as people of color.

History
Springside Chestnut Hill Academy was formed by the 2010 merger between all-girls Springside School and all-boys Chestnut Hill Academy (CHA), private Pre-K–12 schools on adjacent campuses.

Founded in 1861, Chestnut Hill Academy was an all-male Pre-K-12 independent college preparatory school located in northwest Philadelphia. CHA was the oldest all-boys school in Greater Philadelphia.

Springside was founded in 1879 by Ms. Jane Bell and Ms. Walter Comegys as a French and English boarding school for young ladies and girls. The school was located on Norwood Avenue in Chestnut Hill, Philadelphia. Springside was initially a boarding school and attracted students from across the Northeast, particularly in New England, where most boarding schools were only for boys.

Curriculum 
There are more than 100 electives available to Upper School students, including forensics, architectural design, global economics, and multivariable calculus. There are also more than 40 student-led clubs, boards, and activities. SCH teachers have an average of 18 years of experience, and 73% of faculty hold advanced degrees.

In 2012, SCH Academy established the Sands Center for Entrepreneurial Leadership (CEL) to complement its core curriculum and cultivate an entrepreneurial mindset. Philadelphia magazine named SCH one of 19 area schools rethinking education in big and small ways for its CEL program in 2018. The center is unique in the nation in that the entrepreneurial curriculum is built into student schedules from Pre-Kindergarten through grade 12.

In addition to its Center for Entrepreneurial Leadership, SCH has robotics, arts & new media, outdoor education, and sustainability initiatives.

SCH's FIRST Robotics Competition team competed in close to 20 FIRST Championships, finishing four times in the top 10 and winning the FIRST Chairman's Award eight times. In 2019, Team 1218, SCH's Upper School robotics team, won the FIRST World Championship. 

SCH was also one of the first Philadelphia independent schools to offer video production, design, and fabrication classes. Students have won awards in the Greenfield Youth Film Festival, Cappies, Scholastic Art Awards, national DiscoverDesign Competition, Philadelphia Independence Awards, and the WHYY Youth Media Awards.

SCH prioritizes sustainability efforts, including its native arboreta, rain gardens, LEED Gold science, technology center, and rooftop solar panels. SCH earned  3-Star Green Restaurant rating for its school cafeterias and a Green Flag Award from the National Wildlife Federation.

Extracurricular activities

Athletics 
SCH's athletic teams play in the Inter-Academic League (Inter-ac), which, since its inception in 1887, remains the nation's oldest interscholastic athletic conference.

Students can choose from 18 sports, 15 offering junior and varsity levels. The school offers cross country, field hockey, football, golf, soccer, tennis, volleyball, tennis, crew, basketball, ice hockey, track and field, indoor track, squash, wrestling, life sports and fitness, baseball, lacrosse, and softball.

Sports facilities include nine playing fields, two turf fields, the longest continuously used baseball diamond in the U.S., ten squash courts, and an indoor rowing tank. In 2017-2018, SCH won three PAISAA state titles: boys and girls soccer and softball. SCH also won a SEPA championship for girls' soccer and three Inter-AC championships for boys' soccer, softball, and girls' track and field in 2018. In 2021-2022, SCH won two PAISAA state titles: girls' soccer and softball. The crew team sent five boats to Nationals in 2022, and the girls won a National Championship gold medal.

In their third year, the Philadelphia Eagles held training camp at Chestnut Hill Academy prior to the 1935 season.

Campus

The school is situated on a 62-acre campus adjacent to the Wissahickon Creek watershed in Fairmount Park and includes the Wissahickon Inn, listed on the National Register of Historic Places.  

It opened its new McCausland Lower School & Commons in the fall of 2019. The learning experience remains single-sex, with gender- and age-specific pre-k to 4th-grade classrooms, while leveraging the benefits of shared common and cooperative space and access to outdoor learning areas. The building is perched on 10 acres of SCH woods adjacent to the Wissahickon Watershed.

In addition to the Lower School, SCH is home to the Thornley Middle School, and Upper School students travel between campuses for the Center for Entrepreneurial Leadership classes, science classes, and robotics & engineering found in the Rorer Science Center. The Upper School's home is in the historic Wissahickon Inn.

In 2020, the school opened its first Early Childhood Center for children ages 18 months to 4 years old. Aligning with SCH's mission to inspire unbounded curiosity and independent thought, the center follows the Reggio Emilia approach—an internationally recognized and respected teaching method.

Notable alumni

References

External links
 

2010 establishments in Pennsylvania
Chestnut Hill, Philadelphia
Schools in Philadelphia
Private K-12 schools in Pennsylvania
Educational institutions established in 2010